Even Yisrael ("Stone of Israel") may refer to:

Even Yisrael (neighborhood) – historical neighborhood in Jerusalem, Israel
Adin Steinsaltz (born 1937) – rabbi, scholar, philosopher and social critic